Mayu Funada (born 9 November 1990) is a Japanese professional footballer who plays as a goalkeeper for WE League club Chifure AS Elfen Saitama.

Club career 
Funada made her WE League debut on 12 September 2021.

References 

Living people
1990 births
Association football people from Tokyo
Women's association football goalkeepers
Japanese women's footballers
Chifure AS Elfen Saitama players
WE League players